Toney is a given name and a nickname. Notable people with this name include the following:

Given name

First name
Toney Anaya (born 1941), American politician
Toney Clemons (born 1988), American gridiron football
Toney Douglas (born 1986), American basketball player
Toney Freeman (born 1966), American bodybuilder
Toney Lee (fl. 1982–1988) American singer, songwriter and music producer
Toney Mack (born 1967), American basketball player
Toney Penna (1908 – 1995), Italian golfer

Middle name
Cheryll Toney Holley, native American chief
Peter Paul Toney Babey, Canadian indigenous leader

Nickname
Kemp Toney, nickname of Hardin Kimbrough Toney, (1876 – 1955), American politician
Toney Rocks, stagename of Toney Robinson, (fl. 2017), American musician

Surname
Albert Toney (187 –1931), American baseball player
Alrick Toney, Surinamese badminton player
Andrew Toney (born 1957), American basketball player
Anthony Toney (born 1962), American football player
Au'Diese Toney (born 1999), American basketball player
Cliff Toney (born 1958), American football player
Darren Toney (born 1984), American gridiron football player
Fred Toney (1888–1953), American baseball player
Ivan Toney (born 1996), English footballer
James Toney (born 1968), American boxer
Jillian Toney (born 1970), English karateka
Julliet Toney (born 1970), English karateka
Kadarius Toney (born 1999), American football player
Kevin Toney, American pianist and composer
Marcus B. Toney (1840–1929), American Confederate veteran
Michael Roy Toney (1965–2009), American citizen
Oscar Toney, Jr. (born 1939), American soul singer
Renné Toney, Brazilian bodybuilder
Sedric Toney (born 1962), American basketball player
Shaka Toney (born 1998), American football player
Tyler Toney (born 1989), member of American trick shot conglomerate Dude Perfect

See also

Tone (name)
Toner (surname)
Tonny (name)
Tony (name)
Tonye
Torey (name)